The Judy Grahn Award is an annual literary award, presented by Publishing Triangle to honour works of non-fiction of relevance to the lesbian community. First presented in 1997, the award was named in memory of American poet and cultural theorist Judy Grahn.

Winners
1997 — Bernadette Brooten, Love Between Women
1998 — Margot Peters, May Sarton: A Biography
1999 — Judith Halberstam, Female Masculinity
2000 — Hilary Lapsley, Margaret Mead and Ruth Benedict: The Kinship of Women
2001 — Amber Hollibaugh, My Dangerous Desires
2002 — Laura L. Doan, Fashioning Sapphism
2003 — Terry Wolverton, Insurgent Muse: Life and Art at the Woman's Building
2004 — Lillian Faderman, Naked in the Promised Land
2005 — Alison Smith, Name All the Animals
2006 — Tania Katan, My One-Night Stand with Cancer
2007 — Alison Bechdel, Fun Home
2008 — Janet Malcolm, Two Lives: Gertrude and Alice
2009 — Andrea Weiss, In the Shadow of the Magic Mountain
2010 — Rebecca Brown, American Romances
2011 — Barbara Hammer, Hammer!
2012 — Jeanne Córdova, When We Were Outlaws
2013 — Alison Bechdel, Are You My Mother?
2014 — Julia M. Allen, Passionate Commitments: The Lives of Anna Rochester and Grace Hutchins
2015 — Barbara Smith, Ain’t Gonna Let Nobody Turn Me Around: 40 Years of Movement Building with Barbara Smith
2016 — Marcia M. Gallo, “No One Helped”: Kitty Genovese, New York City, and the Myth of Urban Apathy
2017 — Sarah Schulman, Conflict Is Not Abuse
2018 — Rosalind Rosenberg, Jane Crow: The Life of Pauli Murray
2019 — Imani Perry, Looking for Lorraine: The Radiant and Radical Life of Lorraine Hansberry
2020 — Carmen Maria Machado, In the Dream House and Saidiya Hartman, Wayward Lives, Beautiful Experiments: Intimate Histories of Riotous Black Girls, Troublesome Women, and Queer Radicals
2021 — Jenn Shapland, My Autobiography of Carson McCullers: A Memoir
2022 — Briona Simone Jones, Mouths of Rain: An Anthology of Black Lesbian Thought

References

External links
 

Triangle Awards
American non-fiction literary awards
Awards established in 1997
LGBT literary awards